Kyelang (also spelled Keylong) is a town and the administrative centre of the Lahaul and Spiti district in the Indian state of Himachal Pradesh,  north of Manali via Atal Tunnel and  from the Indo-Tibetan border.

Sights and festivals
Kyelang faces the famous Kardang Monastery, the largest and most important monastery in Lahaul, of the Drukpa sect of Tibetan Buddhism, which is on a slope across the river from Keylong.

Sights near Kyelang include the Kardang, Shasur, and Tayul monasteries, all within a few kilometres of Kyelang. There is also a small temple dedicated to the local deity Kelang Wazir in the house of Shri Nawang Dorje that may be visited upon arrangement.

The annual Lahaul Festival is held here each July with a big, busy market and a number of cultural activities.

Tourism
Kyelang is the district headquarters of Lahaul and Spiti district and is home to most of the government offices and facilities in Lahaul. It hosts a regular bazaar.

There are some tourist facilities including a Circuit House, a Public Works Department (PWD) Rest House, a Sainik (Army) Rest House, a Tourist Bungalow, and a number of small hotels.

If you are traveling by car or bike, please adhere speed limits in Lahual spiti valley as speed cameras are in use throughout the area and you will be fined.

Access
Kyelang is accessible from Manali via the Manali-Leh Highway, a part of NH21. Keylang is now accessible year round, but road blocks can occur in winter lasting several days. The peak travel season is during May-June and October, when a lot of tourists visit Rohtang pass and Atal tunnel. There are many buses in summer from Kulu and Manali.

The Manali to Atal tunnel south portal is 25.6km via Solang valley road. The length of Atal tunnel up to North portal is 9 km.

Atal tunnel

While it used to take 4 to 6 hours to ascend, negotiate, and descend the Rohtang pass, it will take only about 15 minutes to travel through the Atal tunnel.

Another way to access the area is by via air to Kullu and then travelling on the Leh-Manali highway to Kyelang.

Climate

References

External links 
 Explore Himachal Lahaul.html
 Indian Government information
 Lonely Planet Online Guide

Cities and towns in Lahaul and Spiti district